Horsham and Crawley was a parliamentary constituency centred on the towns of Horsham and Crawley in West Sussex.  It returned one Member of Parliament (MP)  to the House of Commons of the Parliament of the United Kingdom.

The constituency was created for the February 1974 general election, and abolished for the 1983 general election, when it was largely replaced by the new Horsham and Crawley constituencies.

Boundaries
The Urban Districts of Horsham and Crawley, and the Rural District of Horsham.

Members of Parliament

Elections

References

Parliamentary constituencies in South East England (historic)